Black Sister's Revenge is a 1976 Blaxploitation film written and directed by Jamaa Fanaka. The film stars  Jerri Hayes, Ernest Williams III, and Charles David Brooks, III. The film was released theatrically as Emma Mae, then re-titled to Black Sister's Revenge for home video release.

Plot
Black Sister's Revenge is about a teen moving from a small Southern town in Mississippi, to be with her family in Los Angeles. When Emma Mae (Jerri Hayes) first moves to Los Angeles, she's introduced to Jessie Amos (Ernest Williams III) whom she instantly falls for. Jessie and Zeke (Charles David Brooks III) are eventually locked up for assaulting an officer. When Jessie and Zeke go to jail, Emma Mae starts a carwash to raise money for bail.  When that fails, she plots a bank robbery to get the cash for his bail. She later finds out that he doesn't love her and used her, leading to Emma Mae's dramatic fight scene, beating Jessie senseless and her final speech about how stupid the group was, still having gang wars.

Cast
 Jerri Hayes as Emma Mae
 Ernest Williams III as Jesse Amos
 Charles D. Brooks III as Ezekiel "Zeke" Johnson
 Leopoldo Mandeville as Chay
 Malik Carter as "Big Daddy" Johnson
 Eddie Allen as James
 Gammy Burdett as Daisy Stansell
 Teri Taylor as Dara Stansell
 Synthia Saint James as Ulika Stansell
 Robert Slaughter as Devo
 Eddy C. Dyer as Huari Stansell
 Laetitia Burdett as Melik Stansell

See also
 List of American films of 1976
 List of hood films

References

External links
 
 
 
 

1976 films
Blaxploitation films
1970s English-language films
Films set in California
1976 drama films
Films directed by Jamaa Fanaka
American drama films
1970s American films